Gholam Hossein Mobaser (born 9 March 1929) is an Iranian former sports shooter. He competed at the 1960 Summer Olympics and the 1964 Summer Olympics.

References

External links
 

1929 births
Possibly living people
Iranian male sport shooters
Olympic shooters of Iran
Shooters at the 1960 Summer Olympics
Shooters at the 1964 Summer Olympics
People from Kerman Province